Nachiketa Chakraborty, simply known as Nachiketa, is an Indian singer, songwriter, musician, composer and playback singer who is known for his modern Bengali lyrics. He achieved fame in the early 1990s, with the release of his debut album Ei Besh Bhalo Achi.

Early life

Nachiketa was born in Kolkata at Muktaram Babu Street. His father was Sakha Ranjan Chakravarti. His ancestral roots lie in Chechri Rampur village in Kathalia Upazila of Jhalokati District of Bangladesh. His grandfather Lalit Mohan Chakravarti came to India before 1946. He started composing songs and performing live, as a student of Maharaja Manindra Chandra College in North Kolkata's Shyambazar. In 1993 his first album Ei besh bhalo achi was released; it was an instant hit. Initially he had a huge youth fan following; but gradually, he drew listeners from all age groups. His colloquial language immediately hit the stagnancy of Bengali music in the early 90s. Following the path of Kabir Suman (then Suman Chattopadhay), Nachiketa changed the age-old concept of Bengali lyrics.
Today, he remains a renowned singer-songwriter and composer in Kolkata.

Discography

Solo albums

Ei Besh Bhalo Achi (1993) - Saregama 

 Antobihin Poth Cholai Jibon
 Ei Besh Bhalo Achi
 Jakhon Somay Thomke Daray
 Sare Jahan Se Achcha
 Chor
 Bish, Sudhu Bish Dao
 Kolkata
 Mon Diye Lekhapora Kore Jei Jon
 Tumi Ki Amai Bhalobasho
 Keu Bole Buro Bham
 Shunbo Na Gaan, Gaan Shunbo Na
 Nilanjona - I (Se Prothom Prem Amar)

Ke Jay (1994) - Saregama 

 Ambition
 Ke Jay
 Anirban
 Ek Din Jhor Theme Jabe
 Baro Taka
 Nilanjona (Second Part)
 Swadhinata
 Roj Ghum Theke Otha
 Amaderto Kicchui Nei
 Kalo Meye
 Eito Jibon
 Nilanjona (Third Part)

Ki Hobe (1995) - Saregama 

 Bhoy
 Ki Hobe?
 Purono Diner Gaan
 Shokal Theke Lukochuri
 Eka Eka Potho Chola
 Ulto Rajar Deshe
 Kono Ek Meye
 Madarir Gaan
 Anya Premer Gaan
 Nilanjona (Fourth Part)

Chol Jabo Toke Niye (1996) - Saregama 

 201 Dharmatala
 Chol Jabo Toke Niye
 Feriwala
 Kore Michil
 Poulami
 Shatabdi
 Jaiona Jaiona Konya
 Ahare
 Tumi Ke
 Aschi Anirban (Anirban part 2)

Kuasha Jokhon (1997) - Saregama 

 Kuasha Jokhon
 E Mon Byakul jakhon Takhon
 E Mon Byakul jakhon Takhon (Female)
 It's A Game
 Ek Boka Buror Galpo Shono
 Eri Nam Holo Benche Thaka
 Andhokar Sharoni Dhore

Amiee Pari ! (1998) - Saregama 

 Sarkari Karmochari
 Rajashri(1) 
 Coffee House
 Shrabono Ghanay
 MTV Generation(Abishaser Rin)
 Matha Debo Na
 Bashbei Bhalo
 Nilame Uthche Desh
 Mulazim Hoon Sarkari

Dalchhut (1999) - Saregama 

 Dere Nana
 Ekush
 Bibhabari Jago
 Jibita Bibahita
 Bridhashram
 Chhut
 Rajashri (2)
 E Samay Asamay

Daybhaar (2000) - Saregama 

 Pagla Jagai
 Tumi Kakhano Sunechho Ki
 Mon Bhese Chale
 Satak Aase Satak Jai
 Din Jay Din Chale Jay
 Aamader Janye
 Achena E Sahare
 Bhenge Jai Bissas
 Aanka Banka Sarakta

Ekla Choltey Hoy (2002) - Saregama 

 Box Office
 Ekla Choltey Hoy
 Nagar Jiban
 Ghum Aaire
 Khokon
 Basudeb Nadia Nagar
 Na Na Chai Na
 Pacemaker
 Intellectual
 Rajashri (3)

Mukhomukhi (2003) - Saregama 

 E ki labonnye purno
 Amar moner koner
 Prane Gaan Nai
 BhagerMa Naaki Ganga Paina
 Srabono Ghonoi
 Pinakete Lage Tankar
 Tomar Kache A bar
 Kono Ek Ulto Rajar Deshe
 Ami Mukhhu Sukku Manush
 Ek Bas Hi Tu-Ghazal
 Sawan Ghazal
 Abar Esheche Asar
 Jharo Jharo Barshe

Ei Agune Haath Rakho (2004) - Saregama 

 Din Seshe Ratri Ashe
 O Daktar
 Kopal Amar Mondo
 Amar Buker Jala
 Ei Agune Hath Rakho
 Icchera Dine Raate
 Bol Na Bol Na
 Mon Chay
 Tumi Ashbe Bole
 Rajashree (4)

Ekhon Tokhon (2005) 

 Sabujer Fike Rang
 Majhe Majhe Prithibita
 Ekdin Jabi Chole
 Jwale Buke Ki agun
 Sharabono Ghonay
 Saradin Ghame Bheja
 Jiboner Sobtai
 Bibhabori Jaago

Amar Kotha Amar Gaan (2005) - Aahir Music 

 Keno Aaj Mon Fire Jai
 Raat Ghumalo Chand Ghumalo
 Hai Amay Bole De
 Bolo Ki Chilo Proyojon
 Prothom Pronoyo Duchokhe
 Jodi Oi Chokher Tarai
 Shrabono Dinete Jodi
 Dao Jodi Firiye
 Nare Nare Nare Jibon

Tirjaak (2007) - Sagarika Music 

 Khyapa 
 Buro Solomon
 Abchhaya raate
 Amar Shona
 Anirban (Third Part)
 Sahar O Tumi
 Hashir Gaan
 Dujon Manush
 Bojhai Roj Roj
 Aditya Sen

Ebar Nilanjan (2008) 

 Hote Parto Onek Kichui
 Chater Chadare Mora Chhot
 Ke Rakhe Khoj
 Na Mele Na
 Bujhbena Se Konodin
 E Jibone Kichui Mele Na

Haowa Bodol (2010) - Purple Music 

 Hawa Bodol
 Ratri Ghonay
 Bhabna
 Andher Deshe
 Jukti (Recitation)
 Madhyabitto (Recitation)
 Hawa Bodolo (Track)

Sob Kotha Bolte Nei (2012) 

 Afrin Afrin
 Bhalobashi Bole
 Kaar Chokher Jole
 Mon Mane Na
 Raat Jaga Tara
 Sob Kotha Bolte Nei
 Swapner Pata Jhore Jay
 Tor Duchokhe

Asomoy (2012) 

Ae Samoy Asamoy

Drishtikon (2014) - Dhoom Audio 

Amar Porano
Esechile (Acoustic)
Esechile
Jete Jete Ekla
Momo Chitte
Na Sojoni Na
Nodi Apon Bege

Balika 

 Ahaoban
 Balika
 Ei Manush Manush Hobe
 Ekdin Jaboi Chole
 Jodi Hotat Abar
 Jole Boke Ki Agun
 Maje Maje Prithibita Soto Mone Hooy
 Red Rose
 Shabujer Fike Rong
 Shopno Dekhe Mon

Bonolata 

 Anmone Tary Chobi
 Bonde Mataram
 Bondhu Namo Pothe
 Bonolota
 Dekhe Jaa
 Dole Dole Dole A Mon
 Jhore Pagol Hoya
 Jokhon Amar Boyosh Silo Pach

Din Bodoler Gan (2011) 

 Bhoy Paeo Na Bhoy- Sudeshna. Gurucharan, Smita
 Firiye Dao- Aditi
 Jabdo Korbe Kake _Gurucharan Sing
 Jakhon Tomar Bhangbe Ghum- Gurucharan Sing, Tamal, Antara
 Ke Dekhabe Poth- Nachiketa
 Kobita-Sibaji Panja
 Protibaad Agun- Gurucharan Sing. Tamal. Sudeshna. Smita
 Tar Duto Chokh-Nachiketa

Ei Pratham, Ei Samay, Ei Gaan, Ei Dujan (1997) 

 A Song For Pete
 Chand Kahe Chameli Go
 Ek Muhurte Firiye Dile
 Jaage Jaage Raat
 Jadi Hathat Aabar Dekha Hoy
 Khaoar Gaan
 Khata Dekhe Gaan Geona
 Nayantara
 Nijer Balte Eitukui To
 Paata Jhara Marshume
 Shola Tha Jalbujha
 Suryadayer Raage
 Tinte Bandar

Fire Dekha 

 Bela Boye
 Etihash Lekha.mp
 Hoyto Tumar Hat
 Jhore Jaoa Tara
 Mritto Ashok
 Pasha Pashy Ajo Asi
 Raj Nijjom
 Shoni Saj Belar Se Gan

Hothat Bristi (1998) 

 Ekdin Swapner Din
 Ghum Ashe Na
 Hothat Bristi
 Sonali Prantore

Ishq Bawri (2012) 

 Ei Bristi Anasrishti
 Ekla Mon Ei Mon
 Ishq Sadhana Ishq Kamana
 Phooler Mato Kamal Tumi
 Sona Jhara Ei Je Sakal

Katakoty (2012) 

 Agun Thakbe Klanto Buke
 Khelchhe Katakuti Somoy (Male)

Shomoyer Danai 

 Amar Moner Ei Shunno
 Amar Shopne Dekha
 Anmone Tari Chhobi
 Dekhe Jaa
 Dure Tepantor
 Eije Rokte Ghame Lekha
 Football
 Ghum Ashe Na
 Hater Muthoy Jodi
 Hothat Brishti
 Jemon Dekho Tomar
 Kaal Ja Hoyni
 Koto Chena
 Bodor Bodor
 Shomoy Shroter Danay

Swapner Shohor 

 Aaj Bodle Geche Din
 Ami Ek Feriwala Vai
 E Shob Amderi Jonne
 Nare Na Daony
 Nilanjona 2
 Pagla Jogai
 Rail Line e Body Debo
 Shob Ghotena Ek Jibone
 Shopner Shohor

Aay Deke Jay (2015) 

 Gangaram
 Aay Aay
 E Raat
 Corporate Prem
 Diwana
 He Bhagaban
 Ekta Boyosh
 Khoroch
 Echhe
 beche Achi

Benche Thakar Maane (2017) 
 Ato Sahos Kar
 Nemechhe Brishti
 Sabuj Chhilo
 Tumi Achho Tai
 Tumi Ki Sekhhabe
 Upekkhito Chhata

Albums with other artists 
 Duey Duey Chaar (with Rana, Joy, Sampa, Shikha) (1994)
 Yatra (collection of rabindra sangeet with Ustaad Rashid Khan)(2009)
 Abishkar (with Subhamita & Mou) (2011)
 Feere Dekha (with Subhamita)
 Jodi Hothat Abar (with Sudeshna Ganguly)
 Ami Noi Se Ami (with Mousumi Das)(2008)
 Ebaar Safar (with Anwesha Dutta Gupta)(2009)
 Dron Ebong Ekalabya (with Ekalabya)(2015)
 Setu (with Madhusmita Bhattacharya) (2016)
 Tomake Bhebe Bhebe (with Dipan) (2017)
Singles : 
 Hoyto Abar ( Featured by Joy Shahriar-Bangladesh)

Playback singer 

 Mahanayika ( 2016)
 61 NO GARPAR LANE (2017)
 Onek Holo Ebar To moro (2017)
 BISHORJON (2017)
 Posto (2017)
 Amar Aponjon (2017)
 Mission China (2017)
 Shororipu 2: Jotugriho (2021)
Tonic (2021)
 Chine Badam (2022)
 Ishkabon  (2022)

Music Director 
 Hothat Bristi (1998)
 Khelaghar (1999)
 Hum (The Unity) (unreleased) (2009)
 Samudra Sakshi (2004)
 Go for Goals (2009)
 Katakuti
 TV serial Tumi Asbe Bole (STAR Jalsha, 2014)
 Mahanayika (2016)
 61 Garpar Lane (2017)
 Shopno Dekhe Mon (2017) (Bengali Serial)
 Shortcut (2022)

Actor 
 Kuasha Jakhan (1997) (Bengali Serial)
 Khelaghar (1999)
 Thager Ghar (Bengali Telefilm)
 Target (2010)
 Katakuti (2011)
 Mahanayika (2016)
 61 Garpar Lane (2017)
 Shopno Dekhe Mon (2017) (Bengali Serial)
 Sea Prothom Prem Amar Nilanjona (2018)

References

External links

 NACHIKETA
 'Yes, I'm arrogant. So what?' The Times of India, 30 July 2007

Bengali musicians
Indian male composers
Living people
Maharaja Manindra Chandra College alumni
University of Calcutta alumni
1965 births
Bengali singers
Singers from Kolkata